Sadiq Kirmani (born 21 May 1989) is an Indian cricketer who plays for Karnataka in domestic cricket. He is a right-handed batsman and wicket-keeper. He is the son of former India wicket-keeper Syed Kirmani.

Kirmani played for Karnataka at various age-group levels such as Under-15, Under-19, Under-22 and Under-25, before making his List A debut in December 2015.

Personal life
Sadiq Kirmani was born on 21 May 1989 in Bangalore. His father is Syed Kirmani who played for Karnataka and India as a wicket-keeper. Sadiq has an elder sister Nishat Fatima who is married to the son of former India cricketer Syed Abid Ali. Sadiq did his schooling in St Joseph's Indian High School.

References

External links
 
 

1989 births
Living people
Indian cricketers
Karnataka cricketers
Cricketers from Bangalore